Harbor or Harbour station may refer to:

Railway stations
Ardrossan Harbour railway station in Ardrossan, North Ayrshire, Scotland
Cold Spring Harbor (LIRR station) in Cold Spring Harbor, New York, United States
Egg Harbor City station in Egg Harbor City, New Jersey, United States
Erie Canal Harbor station in Buffalo, New York, United States
Fishguard Harbour railway station in Fishguard Harbor, Wales
Folkestone Harbour railway station in Folkestone, England
Harbor station (MBTA) in Gloucester, Massachusetts, United States
Harbor Freeway station in Los Angeles, California, United States
Harbor Gateway Transit Center in Gardena, California, United States
Harbor Park station in Norfolk, Virginia, United States
Harbor Road station in Staten Island, New York, United States
Laurence Harbor station in Laurence, New Jersey, United States
Lincoln Harbor station in Weehawken, New Jersey, United States
Mariners' Harbor station in Staten Island, New York, United States
Newhaven Harbour railway station in East Sussex, England
Outer Harbor railway station in North Haven, South Australia, Australia
Porthmadog Harbour railway station in Portmadog, Wales
Portsmouth Harbour railway station in Portsmouth, England
Sailors' Snug Harbor station in Staten Island, New York, United States
South Harbor station in Cleveland, Ohio, United States
Taichung Port Station in Qingshui District, Taichung, Taiwan

Military installations
Salem Harbor#Air Station Salem at Salem Harbor in Salem, Massachusetts, United States
Bucks Harbor Air Force Station in Machias, Maine, United States
Naval Station Pearl Harbor in Honolulu, Hawaii, United States
Old Harbor U.S. Life Saving Station in Provincetown, Massachusetts, United States

Sports venues
Harbour Station in Saint John, New Brunswick, Canada